There is more than one island named Scalpay:

Scalpay, Inner Hebrides (near Skye)
Scalpay, Outer Hebrides (near Harris)